Matsumine Tameike (Re) is an earthfill dam located in Akita Prefecture in Japan. The dam is used for irrigation. The catchment area of the dam is 0.7 km2. The dam impounds about 3  ha of land when full and can store 210 thousand cubic meters of water. The construction of the dam was started on 1982 and completed in 1992.

References

Dams in Akita Prefecture
1992 establishments in Japan